Mahmudabad-e Khalajabad (also Romanized as Maḩmūdābād-e Khalajābād) is a village in Qaemabad Rural District of the Central District of Shahriar County, Tehran province, Iran. At the 2006 National Census, its population was 2,596 in 656 households. The following census in 2011 counted 2,250 people in 602 households. The latest census in 2016 showed a population of 2,433 people in 727 households; it was the largest village in its rural district.

References 

Shahriar County

Populated places in Tehran Province

Populated places in Shahriar County